Erin E. Arvedlund is a financial journalist who has written for Barron's, The Wall Street Journal, The Moscow Times, The New York Times, TheStreet.com, and Portfolio.com. On Feb. 1, 2011, her "Your Money" column debuted in The Philadelphia Inquirer.

On May 7, 2001, Barron's published her article "Don't Ask, Don't Tell: Bernie Madoff Attracts Skeptics in 2001". This was only the second investigative article, following closely on Michael Ocrant's May 1, 2001 article in industry publication MARHedge, to question Bernard Madoff's scheme, his demand for investor secrecy and his "enviably steady gains".

When the SEC finally investigated Madoff, after the December 2008 failure of his multi-billion dollar scheme, its Exhibit 104 belatedly mentions the Ocrant and Arvedlund articles:

Arvedlund's father was a money manager in Wilmington, Delaware, where she was raised. She graduated from Ursuline Academy in 1984 and Archmere Academy in 1988, both in Wilmington.  She attended Tufts University before starting her career at Dow Jones News Service. She lives in Philadelphia.

Arvedlund's first book, Too Good to be True: The Rise and Fall of Bernie Madoff, was published in August, 2009. This was followed, in June, 2010, by The Club No One Wanted to Join - Madoff Victims in Their Own Words, which she edited from the stories told by Madoff's victims. Arvedlund also wrote a book on the Libor scandal, Open Secret: The Global Banking Conspiracy That Swindled Investors Out of Billions, published in September, 2014, covering how the London Interbank Offered Rate (Libor), a primary benchmark for short-term interest rates around the world, had been manipulated by major banks across the world.

References

Living people
Dow Jones & Company
Tufts University alumni
The New York Times writers
Writers from Wilmington, Delaware
American business and financial journalists
Year of birth missing (living people)